Etta James Sings for Lovers is the fourth studio album by American Blues artist, Etta James. The album was released on Argo Records in 1962 and was produced by Phil and Leonard Chess. The arrangements were by Al Poskonka and Riley Hampton.

Background
The album was released on a 12-inch LP and consisted of ten tracks with five of them on each side of the vinyl record. The album spawned only one single, "Fools Rush In," which reached the lower ends of the Billboard Pop Chart in 1962. The single's B-side, "Next Door to the Blues" was a major R&B hit, however, it was not included on the album. The album, however, includes cover versions of Pop and Jazz standards, including "Don't Take Your Love from Me" and "Someone to Watch Over Me." The album was re-issued on compact disc in 2013 and on audiophile 180 g vinyl (with bonus CD included) in 2014. Despite not being given a review, Allmusic gave Etta James Sings for Lovers three out of five stars.

Track listing
Side one
 "Don't Take Your Love from Me" (Henry Nemo) - 3:34
 "How Do You Speak to an Angel" (Bob Hilliard, Jule Styne) - 2:36
 "Fools Rush In" (Johnny Mercer, Rube Bloom) - 2:00
 "Don't Blame Me" (Jimmy McHugh, Dorothy Fields) - 2:24
 "Someone to Watch Over Me" (Ira Gershwin, George Gershwin) - 3:37

Side two
 "Again" (Dorcas Cochran, Lionel Newman) - 3:38
 "I Want to Be Loved" (Savannah Churchill) - 3:21
 "It Could Happen to You" (Jimmy Van Heusen, Johnny Burke) - 2:07
 "These Foolish Things" (Eric Maschwitz, Harry Link, Jack Strachey) - 3:57
 "Prisoner of Love" (Clarence Gaskill, Leo Robin, Russ Columbo) - 2:13

Personnel
Technical
Ralph Bass - supervision
Ron Malo - engineer
Al Poskonka, Riley Hampton - arrangements
Don Bronstein - cover

Charts
Singles - Billboard (United States)

References

1962 albums
Etta James albums
Argo Records albums
Albums produced by Leonard Chess
Albums produced by Phil Chess